Uzan Malek (also Romanized as Ūzān Malek; also known as Ūzān Eskandarī, Owzān-e Shāhzādeh Khānom, and Ūzān Malek ot Tojjār) is a village in Baranduzchay-ye Jonubi Rural District, in the Central District of Urmia County, West Azerbaijan Province, Iran. At the 2006 census, its population was 475, in 123 families.

References 

Populated places in Urmia County